Saint Johns is an unincorporated community located in Butler Township in Luzerne County, Pennsylvania. Saint Johns is located at the intersection of St. Johns Road and Mill Mountain Road to the north of Hazleton.

References

Unincorporated communities in Luzerne County, Pennsylvania
Unincorporated communities in Pennsylvania